Los Pehuenches Airport  is an airport serving Lebu, a Pacific coastal city in the Bío Bío Region of Chile.

See also

Transport in Chile
List of airports in Chile

References

External links
OpenStreetMap - Los Pehuenches
OurAirports - Los Pehuenches
SkyVector - Los Pehuenches

Airports in Chile
Airports in Biobío Region